The  is a railway line in western Japan operated by West Japan Railway Company (JR West). It connects Tsuge on the Kansai Main Line with Kusatsu on the Biwako Line (Tōkaidō Main Line).

History
The Kansai Railway Co. opened the entire line in 1889/90, and was nationalised in 1907.

CTC signalling was commissioned in 1979, the line was electrified in 1980 and freight services ceased in 1987.

Construction of a new station, "Minami-Biwako", began in May 2006 and was planned to be completed in 2012; the station was proposed to allow passengers to transfer between the Tōkaidō Shinkansen and Kusatsu lines; however, in September 2006, the Otsu district court concluded that Ritto City issuing bonds to fund the station's construction was illegal under local finance law and the project was halted; the project was officially abandoned in October 2007.

Stations

Train stops at all stations and operates as a local train within the line.

See also
 List of railway lines in Japan

References

Lines of West Japan Railway Company
Transport in Shiga Prefecture
Transport in Mie Prefecture
Railway lines opened in 1889